Zinc finger protein 286A is a protein encoded in humans by the ZNF286A gene.

References

Further reading